This is a list of SMU Mustangs football players in the NFL Draft.

Key

Selections

Notable undrafted players
Note: No drafts held before 1920

References

External links
 

SMU

SMU Mustangs NFL Draft